The Vanikoro monarch (Mayrornis schistaceus) is a species of bird in the monarch family endemic to the Santa Cruz Islands. Its natural habitat is subtropical or tropical moist lowland forests and it is threatened by habitat loss. Alternate names for the Vanikoro monarch include slaty flycatcher (an alternate name shared with the Slaty monarch), small slaty flycatcher, small slaty monarch and the Vanikoro flycatcher (not be confused with the species of the same name, Myiagra vanikorensis).

References

Vanikoro monarch
Birds of the Santa Cruz Islands
Endemic fauna of the Solomon Islands
Vanikoro monarch
Taxonomy articles created by Polbot
Endemic birds of the Solomon Islands